Xylophanes monzoni is a moth of the  family Sphingidae. It is known from Guatemala.

It is similar to Xylophanes falco, but generally darker, with a more diffuse pattern and less falcate forewings. Furthermore, the underside of the abdomen is lacking the two longitudinal grey lines. The forewing upperside is similar but the pale brown-beige area basad of the postmedian lines is covered with scattered black scales. The distal median line is almost reaching the discal spot, the basalmost postmedian line is straight and the postmedian and submarginal lines are less conspicuous against the ground colour. The submarginal and marginal bands are both very dark grey, almost black.

References

monzoni
Moths described in 2003
Endemic fauna of Guatemala